Rubya Chaudhry (born December 21) is a Pakistani actress and fashion model. In 2006 she made her on-screen debut in the Pakistani cult classic slasher film, Zibahkhana. Since then she has appeared in several Pakistani television shows and movies, while appearing in fashion shows.

Model

Rubya Chaudhry was brought up in Karachi. She went into the fashion industry after completing her secondary education. Tall and slim, with a striking face, she was quickly successful. She has worked on the runway for major Pakistani designers, and on commercials and on photo shoots for magazines. 
She has modeled for designers such as Arif Mahmood and Ayesha Hasan
and in shows such as Fashion Pakistan and Karachi Fashion.
In an interview, she has said that fashion is as demanding as acting, 
saying "Fashion is about what you already possess and you refine what you have to work with. In acting, that's not so."

Actress

Rubya Chaudhry has followed her step-mother as an actress in television plays and serials including 6 Degrees (Hum TV), Karachi-Aaj (RC T.V 3), Mission Karachi (Hum TV) and Love Marriage (Geo TV).
She played "Inam-ul-Haq" in Mannchalay, a comedy TV drama serial that was televised on Hum TV. 
She also starred in the 2010 Hum TV teledrama Zindagi Main Kuch Life.
Rubya Chaudhry starred as "Roxy" in the 2007 film Zibahkhana ("Hell's Ground"), called Pakistan's first splatter film, in which a group of teens meets a variety of bloodthirsty ghouls and zombies.
The film has been described as a "gore-lover's paradise." 
However, despite the plot being basically a remake of The Texas Chain Saw Massacre, 
the movie is original in its setting, music and many details, and won international awards.
Rubya Chaudhry was also in the cast of Siyaah, a Pakistani horror film that was released in 2013.
Chaudhry also portrayed a greedy woman in ARY Digital telenovela Parchaiyan. She also plays a prominent role in Mohini Mansion Ki Cinderellayain on Bol Entertainment.

References
Citations

Sources

Living people
21st-century Pakistani actresses
Pakistani film actresses
Pakistani television actresses
Pakistani female models
Year of birth missing (living people)